Dubious Luxury is a 2011 recording by Mike Doughty. It is an avant garde EDM album, consisting of house beats and hip hop breakbeats, with manipulated vocal samples.

One song, "Are You Here?" contains a sample from a 1974 reading by the poet Joanne Kyger.

References
Mike Doughty's official website
AllMusic page

Mike Doughty albums
2011 albums